Strabena rakoto is a butterfly in the family Nymphalidae. It is found on Madagascar. The habitat consists of forest margins, transformed grassland and anthropogenic environments.

References

Strabena
Butterflies described in 1870
Endemic fauna of Madagascar
Butterflies of Africa
Taxa named by Christopher Ward (entomologist)